"How Would You Feel (Paean)" is a song by English singer-songwriter Ed Sheeran. It was released on the 17 February 2017 as the first promotional single from his third studio album ÷ (2017) as well as the eleventh track. Upon release it charted at number 2 on the UK Singles Chart. It has also made the top 10 in six other countries.

Background and release
"How Would You Feel (Paean)" was written by Sheeran while his girlfriend, Cherry Seaborn was on her way to the airport to fly back home after a visit. He wrote the song, recorded on his iPhone and sent it to her in an email. He said that it was written basically just to say to her, "It's really good, I feel happy, how do you feel?" Sheeran admitted that the song nearly didn't make it onto the album, however, because he had forgotten that he had written it. In an interview on On Air with Ryan Seacrest, he said, "I finished the album and I was going through notes and I said to my girlfriend, 'What's your favourite song on the album?' She said, 'You've forgotten it existed and I have it in my e-mail because I'm the only one you sent it to.' So she picked it out from like, a year-and-a-half ago and I ended up recording it."

A guitar solo is played by John Mayer in the song. According to Sheeran, he had initially played the guitar solo himself, but on listening to his recording, thought that it sounded like a "poor man's John Mayer". As he knew Mayer, he contacted him to play the solo.

Sheeran released "How Would You Feel (Paean)" to mark his 26th birthday, although he insisted that it was not an official single.

Critical reception
Cécile Howard of The Edge gave the song 3 stars out of 5 and said, "Not introducing anything new, 'How Would You Feel (Paean)' brings back exactly what the fans' wanted and expected with somewhat of a superficial aftertaste." Taylor Weatherby of Billboard described the song as the one with the "best guitar solo" of the album, writing that Sheeran "pulls out a John Mayer-esque solo about two-thirds of the way through this song that really establishes him as a master of his craft".

Charts

Weekly charts

Year-end charts

Certifications

See also
 List of Scottish number-one singles of 2017
 List of UK Singles Downloads Chart number ones of the 2010s

References

2016 songs
Ed Sheeran songs
Songs written by Ed Sheeran
Number-one singles in Scotland
Blue-eyed soul songs